Oreta vatama is a moth in the family Drepanidae. It was described by Frederic Moore in 1866. It is found in Pakistan, India, Bhutan, northern Myanmar and China.

The length of the forewings is 17–24 mm for males and 20–25 mm for females.

Subspecies
Oreta vatama vatama (north-eastern India, Sikkim, Bhutan, northern Myanmar)
Oreta vatama acutula Watson, 1967 (China: Guangxi, Sichuan, Yunnan, Tibet)
Oreta vatama luculenta Watson, 1967 (north-western India, Kashmir, Pakistan)
Oreta vatama tsina Watson, 1967 (China: Shaanxi, Gansu)

References

Moths described in 1866
Drepaninae